Savelii Sadoma (born 12 October 1998) is a Russian boxer. He participated at the 2021 AIBA World Boxing Championships, being awarded the bronze medal in the light heavyweight event.

References

External links 

1998 births
Living people
Place of birth missing (living people)
Russian male boxers
Light-heavyweight boxers
AIBA World Boxing Championships medalists